Cavan Institute (previously Cavan College of Further Studies) is a third level college located in the town of Cavan in the Republic of Ireland. The college's main campus is located on Cathedral Road, with other sites at Drumalee, in the town centre, and at the former Army Barracks, which was recently purchased by County Cavan VEC. In 2006 the Institute became a registered provider of Further Education and Training Awards Council (FETAC) Courses.

The college offers FETAC awards to all students, with some courses also offering Business and Technology Education Council (BTEC) awards. Overall the Institute offers over 70 post-leaving certificate courses.

Schools
It has numerous courses on offer in its five schools, including:
 Accounting Technician
 Business & Humanities
 Healthcare, Sport & Education
 Beauty Therapy & Hairdressing
 Computing, Engineering & Science
 Design, Performing Arts & Services

The majority of students are Cavan locals, with a large proportion of other students coming from Leitrim, Roscommon, Monaghan, Meath and Westmeath.

Courses offered are accredited by the Confederation of International Beauty Therapy and Cosmetology (CIBTAC), Comité International d’Esthetique et de Cosmetologie (CIDESCO), International Therapy Examination Council (ITEC), International Academy of Travel (IAOT), Institute of Public Administration (IPA), and Cisco Systems.

Links to Institutes of Technology
The Cavan Institute has a number of Memoranda of Understanding with Institutes of Technology. Students can do year 1 of a BSc Level 7 course with IT Sligo, at the Cavan Institute, also year 1 of the BSc and BSc in Computing at Letterkenny Institute of Technology, year 1 of the level 6 of both Business and Applied Social Studies and Social Care with Athlone Institute of Technology and Years 1 and 2 of QQI Level 8 BA in Early Childhood Studies with the School of Lifelong Learning at Dundalk Institute of Technology.

External links
 Cavan Institute Official Website
 Profile on QualifaX, Ireland’s National Learners’ Database.

See also
 Education in the Republic of Ireland
 List of further education colleges in the Republic of Ireland

References

Cavan (town)
Education in County Cavan
Further education colleges in the Republic of Ireland